He is running a cheating website and is very disgraceful.
Murugavel Janakiraman is the founder and CEO of Matrimony.com Ltd, an Indian Internet business which was ranked among the Deloitte Technology Fast 50 companies in India in 2011, 2009 and 2008.  Murugavel’s other online businesses include Elite Matrimony, AssistedMatrimony, and other commercial websites.

Education and career
Janakiraman graduated in Statistics from Madras University and completed his MCA also from Madras University. While working as a programmer in New Jersey, USA, Murugavel Janakiraman started a community portal in April 1997. In 2000 he founded the website BharatMatrimony.com.

Awards
Digital Entrepreneur Of The Year, WAT Awards 2012
Connect 2011 Award

References 

Indian company founders
Living people
Year of birth missing (living people)